Petrus "Peter" Wilhelmus Frederikus Nottet (born 23 September 1944) is a Dutch speed skater who competed in the 1964 Winter Olympics and in the 1968 Winter Olympics. In 1964 he finished 34th in the 5000 metres event.

Four years later he won the bronze medal in the 5000 metres competition. In the 10000 metres contest he finished eighth, in the 1500 metres event he finished ninth, and in the 500 metres competition he finished 30th.

The 5000 m race in 1968 was his milestone. Nationally, his best achievement was second place all-round the same year. He competed in 6 world and 7 European championships but never won a medal, once finishing fourth at the 1969 world championships. He retired from competitions in 1973.

Personal records

Source:

References

1944 births
Living people
Dutch male speed skaters
Olympic speed skaters of the Netherlands
Speed skaters at the 1964 Winter Olympics
Speed skaters at the 1968 Winter Olympics
Olympic bronze medalists for the Netherlands
Sportspeople from The Hague
Olympic medalists in speed skating
Medalists at the 1968 Winter Olympics